Bab Anar (also Romanized as Bāb Anār and Bāb-e Anār; also known as Bābā Anār, Bābā Na‘am, Bābā Najm, and Bāba Nār) is a city in Khafr District, Jahrom County, Fars Province, Iran.  At the 2006 census, its population was 1,702, in 445 families.

References

Populated places in  Jahrom County
Khafr County
Cities in Fars Province